The blue-spotted wrasse (Anampses caeruleopunctatus) is a species of wrasse found from the Atlantic coast of South Africa through the Indian Ocean to Japan and Australia east to Easter Island in the Pacific Ocean (though absent from Hawaii). Juveniles orient their bodies and move in such a way as to resemble floating leaves. It is of minor importance to local commercial fisheries and can be found in the aquarium trade.

References

External links
 

Fish of Thailand
Blue-spotted wrasse
Taxa named by Eduard Rüppell
Fish described in 1829
Labridae